Edward Sloan may refer to:

Edward L. Sloan (1830–1874), Latter-day Saint editor and publisher
Edward Ray Sloan (1883–1964), Justice of the Kansas Supreme Court 
Edward Van Sloan (1882–1964), American film character actor